Palaniyaandi Neelakantan (2 October 1916 – 3 September 1992) was a Tamil film director, who was active for nearly four decades.

Life

He was born at Villupuram, Tamil Nadu. He graduated to movies from stage play. His play Naam Iruvar was brought by movie mogul Avichi Meiyappa Chettiar and made into a film in 1947. Then he wrote the dialogues for films like Vedala Ulagam in 1948. His directorial debut was with Oru Iravu in (1951), the dialogue for which was written by C. N. Annadurai. Two films that made him well-known are ALS productions Ambikapadi (1957) and Thirudadhe (1961). He also has directed movies in Kannada and Sinhalese Suneetha and Sujage Rahase. Neelakantan was mainly associated with creating M. G. Ramachandran's (MGR) movie persona. Between Chakravarthi Thirumagal in 1957 and Needhikku Thalaivanangu in 1976, Neelakantan directed altogether 17 of MGR's movies.

Filmography

References

External links 
 
 Biography of P. Neelakantan
 Directors Part I

1916 births
1992 deaths
Indian film directors
Tamil-language film directors
Tamil Nadu State Film Awards winners
20th-century Indian film directors
Kannada film directors
People from Viluppuram district
Film directors from Tamil Nadu
Screenwriters from Tamil Nadu
Tamil scholars
20th-century Indian screenwriters